Dutch commonly refers to:
 Something of, from, or related to the Netherlands
 Dutch people
 Dutch language

Dutch may also refer to:

Places
 Dutch, West Virginia, a community in the United States
 Pennsylvania Dutch Country

People

Ethnic groups
 Germanic peoples, the original meaning of the term Dutch in English
 Pennsylvania Dutch, a group of early Germanic immigrants to Pennsylvania
Dutch people, the Germanic group native to the Netherlands

Specific people
 Dutch (nickname), a list of people
 Johnny Dutch (born 1989), American hurdler
 Dutch Schultz (1902–1935), American mobster born Arthur Simon Flegenheimer
 Dutch Mantel, ring name of American retired professional wrestler Wayne Maurice Keown (born 1949)
 Dutch Savage, ring name of professional wrestler and promoter Frank Stewart (1935–2013)

Arts, entertainment, and media

Fictional characters
 Dutch (Black Lagoon), an African-American character from the Japanese manga and anime Black Lagoon
 Alan "Dutch" Schaefer, the protagonist of the 1987 film Predator played by Arnold Schwarzenegger
 Dutch van der Linde, a central character from the Red Dead video games
 Dutch Wagenbach, on the TV series The Shield

Other uses in arts, entertainment, and media
 Dutch (film), a 1991 American comedy film starring Ed O'Neill
 Dutch: A Memoir of Ronald Reagan, a 1999 biography with fictional elements by Edmund Morris
 Dutch, the magazine, an English-language magazine about the Netherlands and the Dutch
 Dutching, a gambling term that signifies betting on more than one outcome
 Dutch, an American trip-hop duo that released the 2010 album A Bright Cold Day

Chess
 Bird's Opening, a chess opening also known as the "Dutch attack"
 Dutch Defence, a chess opening

Sports and mascots 
 Dutch Grand Prix, a Formula One car race
 Dutch Open (disambiguation)
 Dutch TT, a motorcycle race, part of the MotoGP World Championship
 Dutch, nickname of college athletic teams of Central College in Pella, Iowa
 Dutch, the mascot of the Union Dutchmen, the athletic teams of Union College

See also 
 Deutsch (disambiguation)
 Double Dutch (disambiguation)
 Dutch Boy (disambiguation)
 Dutch Hill (disambiguation)
 Dutch oven (disambiguation)
 Going Dutch or Dutch treat, an arrangement whereby each person in a group pays for him/herself
 Netherlands (disambiguation)
 

Language and nationality disambiguation pages